Janine Smit (born 18 April 1991) is a Dutch speed skater who specializes in the sprint distances.

Career
She took part in the second competition weekend of the 2018–19 ISU Speed Skating World Cup in Tomakomai, Japan where she finished first in the teams sprint with Letitia de Jong and Jutta Leerdam.

Personal records

References

External links

SppedSkatingNews profile
Eurosport profile

1991 births
Living people
Dutch female speed skaters
Sportspeople from Heerenveen
World Single Distances Speed Skating Championships medalists
21st-century Dutch women